Coccinellinae is a subfamily of lady beetles in the family Coccinellidae. There are at least 20 genera and 90 described species in Coccinellinae.

Genera

These 29 genera belong to the subfamily Coccinellinae:

 Adalia Mulsant, 1846 i c g b
 Aiolocaria (Crotch, 1871)g
 Anatis Mulsant, 1846 i c g b (giant lady beetles)
 Anisosticta Chevrolat in Dejean, 1837 i c g b
 Aphidecta Weise, 1893 i c g b
 Calvia Mulsant, 1850 i c g b
 Ceratomegilla Crotch, 1873 i c g b
 Cheilomenes Chevrolat in Dejean, 1837 i c g
 Coccinella Linnaeus, 1758 i c g b
 Coelophora Mulsant, 1850 i c g b
 Coleomegilla Timberlake, 1920 i c g b
 Cycloneda Crotch, 1871 i c g b (spotless lady beetles)
 Harmonia Mulsant, 1850 i c g b
 Hippodamia Chevrolat in Dejean, 1837 i c g b
 Macronaemia Casey, 1899 i c g b
 Megalocaria Crotch, 1871 i c g
 Micraspis Chevrolat in Dejean, 1837 i c g
 Mulsantina Weise, 1906 i c g b
 Myzia Mulsant, 1846 i c g b
 Naemia Mulsant, 1850 i c g b
 Neda Mulsant, 1850 g b
 Neoharmonia Crotch, 1871 i c g b
 Olla Casey, 1899 i c g b
 Paranaemia Casey, 1899 i c g b
 Propylea Mulsant, 1846 g b
 Psyllobora Chevrolat in Dejean, 1837 i c g b (fungus-eating lady beetles)
 Synonycha Chevrolat in Dejean, 1837 i c g
 Verania Mulsant, 1850 i c g

Data sources: i = ITIS, c = Catalogue of Life, g = GBIF, b = Bugguide.net

Gallery

References

Further reading

External links

 

Coccinellidae
Polyphaga subfamilies
Taxa named by Pierre André Latreille